Antaeotricha spurcatella is a moth of the family Depressariidae. It is found in Guyana and Honduras.

The wingspan is about 25 mm. The forewings are glossy light violet grey with the costa broadly but very indefinitely suffused with ochreous white. The hindwings are grey.

References

Moths described in 1915
spurcatella
Moths of Central America
Moths of South America